Ignazio Abate (born 12 November 1986) is an Italian former professional footballer who played as a full-back and manager of AC Milan's under-19 side. On early stage deployed as a winger, he was also capable of playing as a wide midfielder or as a wing-back, and was even used as a centre-back on occasion; he was renowned for his stamina, quick sprints, and ability to make attacking runs down the right flank. In his prime, he was considered one of the fastest players in the top leagues of European football.

Abate started playing football with amateur club Rescaldina, before joining Milan's youth system in 1999 and making his professional debut for the club in December 2003. From 2004 to 2009, he spent five years on various loan spells with several Italian clubs, before going back to Milan. He played an important role in helping Milan win their 18th Scudetto during the 2010–11 Serie A season. After ten consecutive seasons with Milan and 306 competitive appearances for the team, Abate became a free agent in July 2019.

Abate has represented the Italy national team and the Italy U21 national team, and also played for the Italian U19 national team and the Italian U20 national team. Prior to starring for the senior team, he represented his country in the 2008 Summer Olympics and 2009 European U-21 Championship. He made his senior international debut in November 2011, in a friendly match against Poland, and has since then represented the country in UEFA Euro 2012, winning a runners-up medal, at the 2013 FIFA Confederations Cup, winning a bronze medal, and at the 2014 FIFA World Cup. Nearly two years after his debut, Abate scored his first international goal against Germany in November 2013.

Early years 
Abate was born in Sant'Agata de' Goti, the son of former Italian goalkeeper Beniamino Abate, now a coach with the Milan youth academy.

Club career

Early career 
Abate started playing football with amateur club Rescaldina, before joining AC Milan's youth system in 1999. During the 2003–04 season, he made his professional debut, playing in a Coppa Italia game against Sampdoria on 3 December. He also made his debut in European competitions, in a Champions League group-stage game versus Celta Vigo on 9 December. In that match he set the record as the youngest Milan player to ever play in the UEFA Champions League, at 17 years and 27 days.

Various loan spells (2004–2007) 
For the 2004–05 season he was loaned out to Napoli in Serie C1, where he made 29 appearances and scored 2 goals. In the summer of 2005 he had been set to spend the following season on loan at Serie A side Sampdoria. However, prior to the actual start of the competitions, he was called back and loaned to Piacenza instead, though he only made 13 appearances in his first Serie B season. The following one was more successful for the young winger, who made 38 appearances during his loan spell at Modena.

Serie A debut (2007–2009) 
In the 2007–08 season Abate eventually made his Serie A debut, after being acquired by Empoli in a co-ownership deal, for €900,000. That year, he also scored his first goal in Serie A, in a match against Genoa, on 27 April 2008. Following Empoli's relegation, Milan fully purchased him for €2 million as well as Luca Antonini for €2.75M (and sold Nicola Pozzi and Lino Marzoratti for €4.75M total fee) only to send him to Torino in another co-ownership deal, for €2 million. Despite an early injury, he had a good season, appearing in 25 games and scoring 1 goal.

Back to AC Milan 

On 24 June 2009, Milan reclaimed Abate for €2.55 million and this time he was included in the team roster for the upcoming 2009–10 season. After serving mainly as a reserve midfielder in the first few games, he later started to be employed as the regular right back by Milan head coach, Leonardo. He made 36 appearances in his first season back at Milan. Due to his good performances, on 11 February 2010 he was offered and signed an extension to his contract until 2014.

New coach Allegri kept him in the same position for the 2010–11 season. His dribbling skills and speed in the right wing allowed him to outrun opponent defenders, while his crossing into the centre also resulted in goals regularly. His solid defensive play also lent a hand in winning Milan their 18th Scudetto and the Supercoppa Italiana. He made 37 appearances in total in his second season back at Milan. The following season, Abate was again the starting right back at Milan, making 40 appearances in all competitions. In the 2013–14 season, Abate scored his first Milan goal in a 3–3 draw with Bologna on 25 September 2013

In the 2014–15 season, Abate captained Milan for the first time in his career, the first time in a 2–0 loss to Palermo on 2 November 2014. Abate made his 200th Milan appearance on 9 May 2015, in a 2–1 win over Roma. On 11 June 2015, Milan announced Abate had signed a contract extension to keep him at the club until 2019.

Abate played as a regularly starting right-back in the 2015–16 season. One notable moment for him occurred on 22 February 2016, when he made an excellent sliding tackle on Lorenzo Insigne on the right wing, preventing him from scoring a second goal in a 1–1 away draw against Napoli.

In late March 2017, after initially being sidelined for Milan's following fixtures against Chievo, Juventus, and Genoa, Abate was ruled out for the remainder of the 2016–17 season, due to requiring surgery after suffering "blunt force trauma" to his left eye, after being hit by a ball in the face during a match against Sassuolo on 26 February.

In late 2018, Abate temporarily assumed the role of a centre-back in the wake of an unexpected severe injury crisis that struck the team's defence. In this role, he was praised for his performances by the club's coach, Gennaro Gattuso, and various Italian media outlets alike.

On 19 May 2019, Abate made his final home appearance for Milan in a 2–0 win over Frosinone at the San Siro stadium. During the match, the Milan Ultras of the Curva Sud saluted him by holding up a banner with the message "10 years of commitment and humility. You've gained the respect of the Ultras. Thank you Ignazio." Abate cried after seeing the message. His final appearance for the club came a week later, in a 3–2 away win over SPAL on 26 May.

International career 

After playing at various levels of youth international football for Italy, at under-19 and under-20 level, Abate made his debut with the Italian under-21 side in a friendly against Luxembourg, coming off the bench during the second half, on 12 December 2006.

With the Olympic national team coached by Casiraghi, he won the 2008 Toulon Tournament, in which he played four games and scored a goal against the United States. He also took part in the 2008 Summer Olympics in Beijing. He then participated in the 2009 European U-21 Championship held in Sweden, making two appearances as Italy reached the semi-finals.

Abate made his senior international debut for Italy in November 2011, in a friendly match against Poland. Abate was a member of the Italian squad that reached the UEFA Euro 2012 final.

Abate also took part in the 2013 FIFA Confederations Cup for Italy, making three appearances in the group stage before suffering an injury which kept him out of the semi-finals, as Italy went on to win a bronze medal. Nearly two years after his debut, Abate scored his first international goal in a friendly match against Germany in November 2013, which ended in a 1–1 draw. He was part of Cesare Prandelli's 23-man Italy squad for the 2014 FIFA World Cup held in Brazil, making 1 appearance throughout the tournament, in Italy's 1–0 defeat against Costa Rica in their second group match, as Italy were eliminated in the group stage.

Managerial career 

On 2 July 2021, Abate was appointed as AC Milan's under-16 side coach. In the 2021–22 season, he led Milan U16 to reach the league final, then lost to Roma. On 5 July 2022, Milan announced Abate's promotion as coach of the under-19 side.

Personal life 
Abate and his wife Valentina have three sons, Matteo (born 19 November 2011), Andrea (born 14 May 2013) and Benjamin (born 23 February 2018). The couple got married on 18 June 2015.

Career statistics

Club

International

International goals
Scores and results list Italy's goal tally first.

Honours 
AC Milan
Serie A: 2010–11
Supercoppa Italiana: 2011, 2016
Italy U-21
Toulon Tournament: 2008

Italy
UEFA European Championship runner-up: 2012

References

External links 
Profile at AIC website  

Profile at FIGC website  

1986 births
Living people
Footballers from Campania
Sportspeople from the Province of Benevento
Italian footballers
Association football midfielders
A.C. Milan players
S.S.C. Napoli players
U.C. Sampdoria players
Piacenza Calcio 1919 players
Modena F.C. players
Empoli F.C. players
Torino F.C. players
Serie A players
Serie B players
Italy youth international footballers
Italy under-21 international footballers
Footballers at the 2008 Summer Olympics
Olympic footballers of Italy
Italy international footballers
UEFA Euro 2012 players
2013 FIFA Confederations Cup players
2014 FIFA World Cup players
A.C. Milan non-playing staff